The Honourable Gustavus Hamilton (c. 1685 – 1735) was an Irish MP.

Birth and origins 

Gustavus was born about 1685 in Ireland. He was the second son of Gustavus Hamilton and his wife Elizabeth Brooke. His father would be ennobled in 1715 as Baron Hamilton of StackAllan and advanced to Viscount Boyne in 1717.

Gustavus's mother was the eldest daughter of Sir Henry Brooke by his second wife, Anne St George. Brooke was knight of Brookeborough, County Fermanagh, and governor of Donegal Castle. Gustavus had two brothers and one sister, who are listed in his father's article.

Honourable 
On 20 October 1715, his father was created Baron Hamilton of Stackallan. As son of a peer Hamilton acquired the style "The Honourable".

First term as MP 
In 1716 Hamilton was elected as member of parliament (MP) to one of the two seats for Donegal County during the only Irish parliament of King George I in the by-election that resulted from his brother Frederick's death. That parliament lasted from 12 November 1715 to 11 June 1727 when it was dissolved by the king's death.

Marriage 
In January 1717, Hamilton married Dorothea Bellew, only daughter of Richard Bellew, 3rd Baron Bellew of Duleek.

 
Gustavus and Dorothea had two sons:
Frederick succeeded as 3rd Viscount Boyne
Richard succeeded as 4th Viscount Boyne

—and five daughters.

Second term as MP and death 
Hamilton was reelected to one of the two seats for Donegal County in the general election of 1727, which was held for the only Irish Parliament of King George II, which lasted from 14 November 1727 to 25 October 1760.  Hamilton sat until his death on 26 February 1735.

See also 
 List of parliaments of Ireland

Notes and references

Notes

Citations

Sources 
 
  – Ab-Adam to Basing
  – Bass to Canning
  – Scotland and Ireland
  (for MP of Donegal County)
  – Viscounts (for Boyne)

 

1680s births
1735 deaths
Irish MPs 1715–1727
Irish MPs 1727–1760
Members of the Parliament of Ireland (pre-1801) for County Donegal constituencies
Younger sons of viscounts